Starbrick is a census-designated place located in Conewango Township, Warren County in the state of Pennsylvania, United States.  The community is located along the famous U.S. Route 6, just to the west of the city of Warren.  As of the 2010 census the population was 522 residents.

References

Census-designated places in Warren County, Pennsylvania
Census-designated places in Pennsylvania